Telmatobius huayra is a species of frog in the family Telmatobiidae.
It is endemic to Bolivia.
Its natural habitats are rivers, swampland, and geothermal wetlands.

References

huayra
Amphibians of the Andes
Amphibians of Bolivia
Endemic fauna of Bolivia
Amphibians described in 1995
Taxonomy articles created by Polbot